Sabine Holtz (born 16 September 1959) is a German historian who holds the position of Chair of Regional History at the University of Stuttgart.

Selected works

References

1959 births
Living people
German women historians
Academic staff of the University of Stuttgart
20th-century German historians
21st-century German historians